Xie Jilai (born February 1953) is a former Chinese politician who spent his entire career in north China's Hebei province. As of January 2022 he was under investigation by China's top anti-corruption agency. He has retired for four years. Previously he served as vice chairman of Hebei People's Congress.

Biography
Xie was born in Jinzhou, Hebei, in February 1953. During the Cultural Revolution, he was a teacher in a school between 1972 and 1978. After resuming the college entrance examination, in 1978, he was accepted to Hebei Normal University, majoring in Chinese language and literature. After university, he worked at there.

Xie joined the Chinese Communist Party in April 1980, and got involved in politics in June 1984. Beginning in November 1987, he served in several posts in Organization Department of the CCP Hebei Provincial Committee, including secretary, deputy director, director, deputy head, and executive deputy head. In January 2011, he rose to become vice chairman of Hebei People's Congress, a position at vice-ministerial level.

Downfall
On 26 January 2022, he has been placed under investigation for "serious violations of laws and regulations" by the Central Commission for Discipline Inspection (CCDI), the party's internal disciplinary body, and the National Supervisory Commission, the highest anti-corruption agency of China. On 29 July 2022, he was expelled from the CCP.

References

1953 births
Living people
People from Jinzhou, Hebei
Hebei Normal University alumni
People's Republic of China politicians from Hebei
Chinese Communist Party politicians from Hebei